Emlain Kudo Kabua (born February 1928) is the former First Lady of the Marshall Islands, the widow of former Marshallese President Amata Kabua, and the mother of President David Kabua. Kabua served as the first First Lady of the Marshall Islands from 1979 until 1996.

She is the designer of the Flag of the Marshall Islands.

References

1928 births
Living people
Flag designers
First ladies and gentlemen of the Marshall Islands
Marshallese artists
Parents of presidents of the Marshall Islands